Bangladesh Bank Taka Museum (Bengali: বাংলাদেশ ব্যাংক টাকা জাদুঘর) is a numismatic museum in Dhaka, Bangladesh run by Bangladesh Bank. The museum displays the history of currency in Bangladesh from the ancient times to the present. It also displays the currencies of different countries of the world.

History 
Taka Museum was first established as a Currency Museum in 2009 at the 3rd floor of the main building of Bangladesh Bank at Motijheel in Dhaka, Bangladesh. But it was not open to the general public. Considering the importance and necessity,  Atiur Rahman, former governor of Bangladesh Bank, took the initiative to establish a full-fledged currency museum equipped with modern digital facilities, technology, architecture & art. Later on, Taka Museum was established in the Bangladesh Bank Training Academy in Mirpur, Dhaka on 5 October 2013 by Shirin Sharmin Chaudhury. From then the museum is open to all.

Galleries

Collections 
The total collection reaches to 10,100 in numbers at present (as of July 2021) including the metal and paper currency of Bangladesh from ancient to date and currencies from different countries of the world.

References

Further reading 

 

Numismatic museums in Asia
Museums in Dhaka
2013 establishments in Bangladesh
Currencies of Bangladesh